You Chung Hong (Chinese: 洪耀宗 pinyin: Hóng Yàozōng) (May 4, 1898 – November 1977) was an American attorney and community leader who was the second Chinese American lawyer admitted to practice law in the state of California, having passed the bar examination in 1923 before he became the first Chinese American graduate of the University of Southern California Law School. Chan Chung Wing was the first Chinese American to become a member of the California Bar in 1918.  Hong played a major role in the development of Chinatown in Los Angeles, helping rebuild the community after it was relocated to accommodate the construction of Union Station in the 1930s.

Biography

Hong was born on May 4, 1898 in San Francisco, California, his father a Chinese immigrant who had worked constructing railroads. He moved to Los Angeles after graduating from Lowell High School. There he worked as an interpreter for the United States Immigration and Naturalization Service and taught English to recent immigrants as a means to pay for his education. He graduated from the University of Southern California Law School in 1924 with a Bachelor of Laws degree in 1924 and a Master of Laws degree in 1925. He passed the bar on March 26, 1923, not yet having completed law school, making him the second Chinese American in California admitted to practice law in the state.

Immigration law attorney

As an attorney, Hong worked to overturn the Chinese Exclusion Act of 1882, including testifying before the United States Senate on its effects. Hong became the first Chinese American to be eligible to appear before the Supreme Court of the United States when he was admitted in 1933. An active member of the local Chinese community, he was named  president of the local chapter of the Chinese American Citizens Alliance when he was 28 years old.

The construction of Union Station in the 1930s involved the destruction of the city's existing Chinatown, and Hong played a pivotal role in developing its replacement, the first in the United States to be owned exclusively by its Chinese residents, both as an investor and in offering legal guidance. He designed a series of buildings on Gin Ling Way, one of which ultimately housed his legal office, and developed the main entrance gate on Broadway and its neon lighting.

His legal practice, the first in Los Angeles owned by a Chinese American, specialized in immigration law, and Hong became one of the top specialists in the field. Area residents approached him to assist with reunification with family members, such as the family of United States District Court Judge Ronald S.W. Lew.

After his death, his papers were donated to the Huntington Library, where the "Y.C. Hong: Advocate for Chinese-American Inclusion" exhibit was held on November 21, 2015 to March 22, 2016.

References

1898 births
1977 deaths
American people of Chinese descent
Lawyers from Los Angeles
USC Gould School of Law alumni
Chinatown, Los Angeles